San Juan de Beleño (officially and in Asturian, San Xuan de Beleño) is one of nine parishes in Ponga, a municipality within the province and autonomous community of Asturias, in coastal northern Spain.

It stands adjacent to the mountainous Parque natural de Ponga (Ponga Natural Park).

References

Parishes in Ponga